Vai Passar Mal is the debut studio album by Brazilian drag queen Pabllo Vittar. It was released on January 12, 2017. Vittar collaborated with several producers on the album, including Brabo (producers Rodrigo Gorky and Maffalda) and Diplo (who co-produced Então vai). The album incorporates a wide range of genres, including pop trap, funk carioca and house. The album was mixed and mastered in Los Angeles by Gorky & Turbotito.

Vai Passar Mal was well received by the public and music critics for its short and well-produced tracks, with lyrics about self-esteem. The second single, "Todo Dia", has reached more than 50 million views on YouTube in two months, becoming the most viewed music video by drag queen in the world and peaked at number 3 on Spotify's Viral 50 Global list. The third single, "K.O.", broke Vittar's own record and became his most viewed music video with more than 356 million views on YouTube. The song reached number 2 on Spotify's Brazil chart. On August 11, 2017, "K.O." became the first video by a drag queen to reach 100 million views on YouTube.

The photos of the album were made by photographer Marlon Brambilla in a disabled factory of mannequins.

It was elected the 8th best Brazilian album of 2017 by the Brazilian edition of Rolling Stone.

Controversy 
On August 1, 2017, the music video for "Todo Dia" was removed from YouTube after the writer of the song, Rico Dalasam, filed a lawsuit against the producers of the song. On August 9, the song was removed from all digital platforms, including Spotify.

Track listing 

Notes
 "Todo Dia" is unavailable on streaming services.

Certifications

References 

2017 debut albums
Pabllo Vittar albums